Charles Gaudelet (1817–1870) was a French master-glass-maker from Lille. He worked exclusively with the painters Victor Mottez and occasionally with Bruno Chérier. The cartoons from his studio were acquired by the musée des Beaux-Arts de Lille in 1870 at the instigation of the painter and collector Camille Benoît.

1817 births
1870 deaths
Artists from Lille
French stained glass artists and manufacturers